The 2021 Vesuvio Cup was a professional tennis tournament played on clay courts. It was the first edition of the tournament which was part of the 2021 ATP Challenger Tour. It took place in Ercolano, Italy between 11 and 17 October 2021.

Singles main-draw entrants

Seeds

 1 Rankings are as of 4 October 2021.

Other entrants
The following players received wildcards into the singles main draw:
  Matteo Arnaldi
  Jacopo Berrettini
  Raúl Brancaccio

The following player received entry into the singles main draw using a protected ranking:
  Filippo Baldi

The following player received entry into the singles main draw as an alternate:
  Andrea Arnaboldi

The following players received entry from the qualifying draw:
  Luciano Darderi
  Jonáš Forejtek
  Álvaro López San Martín
  Alexander Ritschard

The following player received entry as a lucky loser:
  Evan Furness

Champions

Singles

  Tallon Griekspoor def.  Alexander Ritschard 6–3, 6–2.

Doubles

 Marco Bortolotti /  Sergio Martos Gornés def.  Dustin Brown /  Andrea Vavassori 6–4, 3–6, [10–7].

References

2021 ATP Challenger Tour
2021 in Italian tennis
October 2021 sports events in Italy